Coolie is a Malayalam language film which was released in 1983. It stars Ratheesh, Mammootty and Shankar in lead roles, directed by Ashok Kumar, produced by Sooryodaya Creation. It also has Lalu Alex, Sreenivasan and Nalini in supporting roles.

Plot
The story revolves around the life of Sethu (Shankar), Madhu (Ratheesh) and Kunjali (Mammootty), and all the events that surrounds them.

Cast
 Ratheesh as Madhu
 Mammootty as Kunjali
 Shankar as Sethu
 Lalu Alex as Shaji
 Sreenivasan as Gopalan
 Nalini as Lekha
 Anuradha as Sreedevi
 Nithya

References

External links
 

1980s Malayalam-language films
Films scored by Raveendran